Peggy S. Scott (born December 1961) is an American politician serving in the Minnesota House of Representatives since 2009. A member of the Republican Party of Minnesota, Scott represents District 31B in the northern Twin Cities metropolitan area, which includes the cities of Andover and East Bethel and parts of Anoka and Isanti Counties. She is a small business owner and realtor.

Early life, education, and career
Scott graduated from Lowthian College, now called the Art Institutes International, in Minneapolis, in 1983, majoring in fashion merchandising. In addition to owning and operating a real estate investment company with her husband, she has been active in her community, serving on the Andover Parks and Recreation Commission, and coaching youth soccer and basketball. She is involved with the women's and youth ministry programs at her church and has served as an after-school care coordinator at the congregation's school.

Minnesota House of Representatives
Scott was elected to the Minnesota House of Representatives in 2008 after incumbent Chris DeLaForest opted not to seek reelection, and has been reelected every two years since.

During the 2011-12 legislative session, Scott chaired the Data Practices Subcommittee of the Civil Law Committee. In 2013-14, she served as an assistant minority leader. From 2014 to 2018 Scott chaired the Civil Law and Data Practices Committee. She serves as the minority lead on the Judiciary Finance and Civil Law Committee and again as an assistant minority leader.

Electoral history

References

External links

 Rep. Scott Web Page
 Project Votesmart - Rep. Peggy Scott Profile
 Session Weekly 1/23/2009: "Taking the chance: With open seat, Scott knew now is her time to serve"
 Peggy Scott Campaign Web Site
 5/10/2013: "Minnesota Republican: ‘My heart breaks’ over same sex marriage win"

Living people
1961 births
People from Andover, Minnesota
Republican Party members of the Minnesota House of Representatives
Women state legislators in Minnesota
21st-century American politicians
21st-century American women politicians